Buddhist studies, also known as Buddhology, is the academic study of Buddhism. The term Buddhology was coined in the early 20th century by the Unitarian minister Joseph Estlin Carpenter to mean the "study of Buddhahood, the nature of the Buddha, and doctrines of a Buddha", but the terms Buddhology and Buddhist studies are generally synonymous in the contemporary context. According to William M. Johnston, in some specific contexts, Buddhology may be viewed as a subset of Buddhist studies, with a focus on Buddhist hermeneutics, exegesis, ontology and Buddha's attributes. Scholars of Buddhist studies focus on the history, culture, archaeology, arts, philology, anthropology, sociology, theology, philosophy, practices, interreligious comparative studies and other subjects related to Buddhism.

In contrast to the study of Judaism or Christianity, the field of Buddhist studies has been dominated by "outsiders" to Buddhist cultures and traditions, hence it is not a direct subfield of Indology or Asian studies. However, Chinese, Japanese and Korean universities have also made major contributions, as have Asian immigrants to Western countries, and Western converts to Buddhism.

University programs and institutes

Asia 
In Asia, University of Tokyo and Rissho University have long been a major centers for Buddhist research, and Nalanda University launched a master program at 2016.

Japan 

Most major universities in Japan have departments of Eastern philosophy, including Buddhist studies or Indian philosophy.

University of Tokyo (Dpt. of Indian Philosophy and Buddhist Studies) and Kyoto University (Dpt. of Buddhist Studies) are public universities which have specialized Buddhist studies departments.

Toyo University (non-sect, but associated with the Honganji) a private university founded by Inoue Enryo, is also renowned for its Buddhist studies.

Buddhist studies is also studied in universities run by various religious denominations.

 Intersect: Taisho (Tendai, Singon-Chizan, Jōdo, Shingon-Buzan, Jishū)
 Esoteric sects: Koyasan (Shingon), Shuchiin (Singon-Chizan, Shingon-Buzan, Shingi-Shingon)
 Lotus Sutra sects: Rissho (Nichiren), Minobsan (Nichiren)
 Pure Land sects: Bukkyo (Jōdo), Ryukoku (Honganji), Musashino (Honganji), Otani (Ōtani), Doho (Ōtani)
 Zen sects: Komazawa (Sōtō), Hanazono (Rinzai)

America 
The first graduate program in Buddhist studies in North America started in 1961 at the University of Wisconsin–Madision. According to Prebish, Buddhist studies in the United States prior to 1975 was dominated by the University of Wisconsin, Harvard University and the University of Chicago. Prebish cites two surveys by Hart in which the following university programs were found to have produced the most scholars with U.S. university posts: Chicago, Wisconsin, Harvard, Columbia, Yale, Virginia, Stanford, Berkeley, Princeton, Temple, Northwestern, Michigan, Washington, and Tokyo.

Other regionally-accredited U.S. institutions with programs in Buddhism include the University of the West, Institute of Buddhist Studies, Naropa University, Dharma Realm Buddhist University and the California Institute of Integral Studies (a number of dharma centers offer semi-academic, unaccredited study).

Europe 
Prominent European programs include Oxford University and Cambridge University, School of Oriental and African Studies, Humboldt University of Berlin, University of Hamburg, University of Munich, University of Heidelberg, University of Bonn, University of Vienna, Ghent University, and the Sorbonne.

Scholars and scholar-practitioners
Charles Prebish, a scholar-practitioner and Chair of Religious Studies at Utah State University, states that the Buddhist studies and academics in North American universities include those who are practicing Buddhists, the latter he terms as “scholar-practitioners.”.

Professional associations
International Association of Buddhist Studies

Publications

Journals specializing in Buddhist Studies (in alphabetical order):
Buddhist Studies Review
Canadian Journal of Buddhist Studies
Contemporary Buddhism
Dhammadhara Journal of Buddhist Studies
The Eastern Buddhist
The Indian International Journal of Buddhist Studies 
International Journal for the Study of Humanistic Buddhism
Journal of Buddhist Ethics
Journal of Buddhist Philosophy
Journal of Chinese Buddhist Studies
Journal of Global Buddhism
Journal of Indian and Buddhist Studies / Indogaku Bunkkyogaku Kenkyu
Journal of the International Association of Buddhist Studies
Journal of the International College for Postgraduate Buddhist Studies
Journal of the Oxford Centre for Buddhist Studies
Pacific World: Journal of the Institute of Buddhist Studies
The Pure Land: Journal of the International Association of Shin Buddhist Studies
Sengokuyama Journal of Buddhist Studies
Thai International Journal of Buddhist Studies
Universal Gate Buddhist Journal / 普門學報

In addition, many scholars publish in journals devoted to area studies (such as Japan, China, etc.), general Religious Studies, or disciplines such as history, anthropology, or language studies. Some examples would be:
Indo-Iranian Journal
Japanese Journal of Religious Studies
Journal of Chinese Religions
Journal of Indian Philosophy
Journal of the Pali Text Society
Philosophy East and West
Buddhist-Christian Studies

Major university presses that have published in the field include those of Oxford, Columbia, Cambridge, Indiana, Princeton, SUNY, and the Universities of California, Chicago, Hawaii, and Virginia. Non-university presses include E.J. Brill, Equinox, Palgrave, Routledge, Silkworm Books, and Motilal Banarsidass. A number of scholars have published through "dharma presses" such as BPS Pariyatti, Parallax Press, Shambhala, Snow Lion, and Wisdom Publications.

See also 
 Pali Text Society
 Buddhist Publication Society
 List of modern scholars in Buddhist studies
 Oxford Centre for Buddhist Studies

References

Sources

Further reading
 de Jong, J. W. A Brief History of Buddhist Studies in Europe and America. Tokyo: Kosei Publishing Company, 1997, 
 Gombrich, Richard (2005). Fifty years of Buddhist studies in Britain, Buddhist Studies Review 22 (2), 141-154
 Rocha, Cristina; Baumann, Martin (2008). Buddhists and Scholars of Buddhism: Blurred Distinctions in Contemporary Buddhist Studies, Journal of Global Buddhism 9, 81-82
 Swearer, Donald K. and Promta, Somparn. The State of Buddhist Studies in the World 1972-1997. Bangkok: Center for Buddhist Studies, Chulalongkorn University, 2000, 

 
Buddhist education